Cyprus competed at the 2012 Summer Paralympics in London, United Kingdom from August 29 to September 9, 2012.

Medallists

Athletics 

Men’s Track and Road Events

Shooting 

Men

Swimming

Women

See also

 Cyprus at the 2012 Summer Olympics

References

Nations at the 2012 Summer Paralympics
2012
2012 in Cypriot sport